Berrahal is a district in Annaba Province, Algeria. It was named after its capital, Berrahal.

Municipalities
The district is further divided into 3 municipalities:
Berrahal
Oued El Aneb
Treat

Districts of Annaba Province